Emily Mortimer is an English-American actress. She gained prominence with her performance in Nicole Holofcener's Lovely & Amazing (2001), which won her the Independent Spirit Award for Best Supporting Female. She is also known for her voice performance in the English dub of Hayao Miyazaki's Howl's Moving Castle, and for her roles in Match Point (2005), The Pink Panther (2006), Lars and the Real Girl (2007), Shutter Island (2010), and Mary Poppins Returns (2018). In television, she starred as Mackenzie McHale on HBO's The Newsroom (2012–2014), and marked her directorial debut with the miniseries The Pursuit of Love (2021).

Filmography

Film

Television

Video games

References

External links
 

Actress filmographies
British filmographies